Only the Strong may refer to:

 Only the Strong (film), a 1993 action film
 Only the Strong (Big Noyd album), 2003 
 Only the Strong (Thor album), 1985